Vule Airways Limited  is a privately owned airline in Uganda. Established in March 2017, it was expected to begin scheduled commercial flights in November 2017.

Operations
The company's corporate headquarters are at 515 Mbogo Road, Kibuli Hill, Kampala, Uganda. The airline maintains a sales office in the central business district of Kampala, at 13-15 Kimathi Avenue, and another office in southwest London, in the United Kingdom.

As of August 2017, the company was waiting for the award of an air operator's certificate by the Uganda Civil Aviation Authority (UCAA). The company planned to hire 60 employees initially and lease six aircraft to provide domestic, regional and international passenger and cargo services.

In August 2017, Ch-aviation reported that Vule Airways had secured an air services licence (ASL) from the Ugandan Civil Aviation Authority.

Ownership
The company's shares are owned by Ugandans (55 percent) and non-Ugandans (45 percent).

List of notable shareholders:

 Robert Mwesigwa Nviiri
 Lameck Nsubuga Mukasa
 Fixon Okonye Akonya
 Jones Yosiya Kyazze 
 Margaret Anne Mazzi Wampamba
 Nixon Kitimoi 
 Ronah Sserwada 
 Fred Keays
 Adam Hirschfield

Destinations
Vule Airways expects to start services to six domestic airports. Services are then to expand to the regional airports, within the countries of the East African Community. The company also expects to serve Johannesburg, Tunis and London, and to expand service as demand grows.

Fleet
According to the company website, the company expects to lease six aircraft, including one 40-seater Bombardier Dash 8-200, one 78 seater Bombardier Dash Q400, three 128-seater Boeing 737-700s and one 300-seater Boeing 777-200ER.

Governance
The Management Team includes the following: 

 Robert Mwesigwa Nviiri, Founder and Managing Director 
 Barnet Kiyaga, Board Chairman
 Rachel Nsiyona Lutalo, Company Secretary
 Ssendagire Hassan Wasswa, Director of Finance and Administration
 Susan Othieno, Marketing Manager
 Rev. Fr. D. S. Mwebe, Board member and Special Advisor
 Kasule Kalule, Business Advisor

See also
 List of airlines of Uganda

References

External links
 Vule Airways
 Airline information at Ch-Aviation.com
 Ugandan Owned Airline Joins Aviation Industry (Video)

Airlines established in 2017
Kampala District
2017 establishments in Uganda
Airlines of Uganda
Defunct airlines of Uganda